Chah Zebar (also Romanized as Chāh Zebar and Chah-e Zebar; also known as Chāh-e Zebar Bondasht, Chāh-e Zebr-e Bon Dasht, and Chāh Zebr Bondasht) is a village in Izadkhvast-e Sharqi Rural District, Izadkhvast District, Zarrin Dasht County, Fars Province, Iran. At the 2006 census, its population was 252, in 73 families.

References 

Populated places in Zarrin Dasht County